Berlusconi may refer to:

People
 Barbara Berlusconi (born 1984), businesswoman
 Marina Berlusconi (born 1966), Italian businesswoman
 Paolo Berlusconi (born 1949), Italian newspaper editor
 Pier Silvio Berlusconi (born 1969), Italian entrepreneur
 Silvio Berlusconi (born 1936), Italian politician and businessman

Other uses
 Trofeo Luigi Berlusconi, an annual friendly football match
 No Berlusconi day, spontaneous mass political event
 Pizza Berlusconi, a reindeer pizza sold by Finnish chain Kotipizza

Italian-language surnames